Harmon is the Amerecianization of the Germanic names Hermann or Harmann.  It may be a surname or given name.

As a given name
 Harmon P. Burroughs (1846–1907), American farmer and politician
 Harmon Dobson (1913–1967), American entrepreneur and co-founder of Whataburger
 Harmon Killebrew (1936–2011), American baseball player
 Harmon Murray (1868 or 1869 – 1891), American gangster and serial killer
 Harmon T. Ogdahl (1917–2009), American politician and businessman
 Harmon Rabb, fictional character in 1990s and 2000s American television series JAG
 Harmon Wilfred, stateless businessman based in New Zealand
 Harmon Wray (c. 1947–2007), American prison reformer, human rights and death penalty activist

As a surname
 Angie Harmon (born 1972), American model/actress
 Butch Harmon (born 1943), American golfer
 Byron Hill Harmon (1876–1942), pioneering photographer of the Canadian Rockies
 Charles Harmon (died 1886), Liberian politician
 Chuck Harmon (born 1924), American baseball player
 Claude Harmon (1916–1989), American golfer
 Clifford B. Harmon (1866–1945), American sportsman and aviator
 Dan Harmon (born 1973), American writer and performer
 Daniel Williams Harmon (1778–1843), Canadian fur trader and diarist
 Dick Harmon (1947–2006), American golfer
 Elaine D. Harmon (1919-2015), American aviator
 Elise Harmon (1909–1985), American scientist in chemistry and physics
 Emmett Harmon, Liberian member of the World Scout Committee
 Ernest N. Harmon (1894–1979), World War II United States Army general
 George Harmon (disambiguation), several people
 Glen Harmon (1921–2007), Canadian ice hockey defenceman
 Henry Harmon (1839–1889), American politician
 Jessica Harmon (born 1985), Canadian actress and director
 Kelvin Harmon (born 1997), American football player
 Leon Harmon (1922–1982), American cyberneticist
 Leonard Roy Harmon (1917–1942), American decorated sailor
 Malone M. Harmon, American engineer
 Mark Harmon (born 1951), American actor
 Mike Harmon (born 1958), American race car driver
 Millard Harmon (1888–1945), United States Army Air Force general
 Raymond Salvatore Harmon (born 1974), American media artist
 Richard Harmon (born 1991), Canadian actor
 Terry Harmon (born 1944), American baseball player
 Tina Harmon (1969–1981), American murder and rape victim
 Tom Harmon (1919–1990), American football player
 William Harmon (born 1938), American poet
 William E. Harmon, founder of William E. Harmon Foundation; Harlem Renaissance patron

See also
Harman (surname)

References 

English-language surnames